Parisi v. Davidson, 405 U.S. 34 (1972), was a United States Supreme Court case resulting in the grant of habeas corpus relief to a soldier, Joseph Parisi, seeking an honorable discharge as a conscientious objector. The case was argued on October 19 and 20, 1971, and decided on February 23, 1972. The respondent was then Major General Phillip B. Davidson.

Parisi had brought a petition to Federal District Court that the Army's refusal to discharge him constituted habeas corpus – that in effect he was being unlawfully imprisoned. As a result, court-martial charges were brought against him by the Army. The Federal District Court and Court of Appeals concluded that consideration of his petition should be deferred pending the result of the court-martial. The Supreme Court decision overturned this, freeing the District Court to consider his petition.

See also
List of United States Supreme Court cases, volume 405

External links
 

United States Supreme Court cases
United States Supreme Court cases of the Burger Court
United States military case law
American conscientious objectors
1972 in United States case law